Li Yanan (born 27 April 1994) is a Chinese judoka.

She is the gold medallist of the 2016 Judo Grand Prix Qingdao in the -48 kg category and is scheduled to present China at the.2020 Summer Olympics.

References

External links
 

1994 births
Living people
Chinese female judoka
Judoka at the 2020 Summer Olympics
Olympic judoka of China
20th-century Chinese women
21st-century Chinese women